Üçyüzlü is an underground rapid transit station on the M1B line of the Istanbul Metro. It was opened on 14 June 2013 as part of the four new stations of the M1B extension to Kirazlı.

Layout

References

Railway stations opened in 2013
2013 establishments in Turkey
Istanbul metro stations
Esenler